Mats Johan Olausson (17 April 1961 – 18 February 2015) was a Swedish keyboard player  known from bands such as Yngwie Malmsteen, Ark, Evil Masquerade, Kamelot, Jean Beauvoir, John Norum, and many others. Recently he lived in Thailand where he was active as a musician, composer and producer. Olausson played Korg Trinity Pro Tri PBS and Yamaha SY-99, SY-77, CS-80. In the studio he also used a grand piano, Hammond B-3 or C-3. He was born in Gothenburg, Sweden.

On 19 February 2015, Olausson's body was found in a hotel in Thailand, having died at least 24 hours earlier. He was 54.

References

1961 births
2015 deaths
Swedish keyboardists
Talisman (band) members
People from Gothenburg
Ark (Norwegian band) members
Iron Mask (band) members
Yngwie J. Malmsteen's Rising Force members
Baltimoore members